Incomparable may refer to:

Comparability, in mathematics, with respect to a given relation over a set
HMS Incomparable, a proposal for a very large battlecruiser, suggested in 1915
Incomparable (diamond), one of the largest diamonds ever found
Anupama (1966 film) aka "Incomparable"
Incomparable (Faith Evans album), a 2014 album
Incomparable (Dead by April album), a 2011 album

See also 
 Comparable (disambiguation)
 Incomparability property (commutative algebra)
 Indistinguishability (disambiguation)